Henrik Tallberg (born 3 July 1942) is a Finnish former sailor who competed in the 1964 Summer Olympics and in the 1968 Summer Olympics.

References

1942 births
Living people
Finnish male sailors (sport)
Olympic sailors of Finland
Sailors at the 1964 Summer Olympics – Star
Sailors at the 1968 Summer Olympics – Star